The Fredrika Bremer Association (abbreviated FBF) is the oldest women's rights organisation in Sweden. The association stands for an inclusive, intersectional and progressive liberal feminism, and advocates for women's rights and LGBT rights. It is traditionally the foremost organisation of the bourgeois-liberal women's movement in Sweden. It has always been open to both women and men. It is a member of the International Alliance of Women, and is a sister association of the Danish Women's Society, the Norwegian Association for Women's Rights and the Icelandic Women's Rights Association.

Activity
The FBF works with forming public opinion in favor of gender equality by information and activities, and by handing out money from various funds and scholarships. It collaborates with other organisations with similar goals both nationally and internationally. The FBF had a representative in the governmental council of equality.

History
The organisation was founded in 1884 by a group largely consisting of the board of the women's magazine Home Review. It consisted of the feminist Sophie Adlersparre, Ellen Anckarsvärd, 
Fredrika Limnell, Ellen Fries, Hans Hildebrand and G. Sjöberg. It was named in honor of the Swedish novelist Fredrika Bremer, whose novel Hertha was responsible for the legislation emancipating unmarried women from wardship of their male relatives. It also led to the foundation of Gothenburg's Women's Association in Sweden's second city of Gothenburg, which was founded as a local answer to the FBF.

The purpose of the organisation was to support women's rights, to inform women of their rights and to encourage them to use them. At the time of its foundation, for example, the focus was to inform women of their rights to serve in the boards of public institutions, and of the rights of women of a certain income to vote in municipal elections and to use those rights. By 1890, the office of the organisation in Stockholm functioned as an employment agency for women of the middle classes, and offered juridical, economical and medical information and advice to women. It was also noted at that time, that many women came there to be informed of the movement for women suffrage. In 1899, a delegation from the FBF presented a suggestion of woman suffrage to prime minister Erik Gustaf Boström. The delegation was headed by Agda Montelius, accompanied by Gertrud Adelborg, who had written the demand. This was the first time the Swedish women's movement themselves had officially presented a demand for suffrage.

In 1890, the Svenska drägtreformföreningen became a part of the FBA, and in 1896, the Married Woman Property Association was merged in the association.

It is a member of the International Alliance of Women, which has general consultative status with the United Nations ECOSOC. It was also a member of the Joint Organization of Nordic Women's Rights Associations.

Publications
The FBF published the women's magazine Dagny, which succeeded Adlersparre's Home Review in 1886. This publication was renamed Hertha in 1914 and was the oldest women's magazine in the world when it was discontinued in the late 1990s.

Presidents
1884–1903: Hans Hildebrand
1903–1920: Agda Montelius
1920–1937: Lizinka Dyrssen
1937–1949: Hanna Rydh
1949–1958: Elsa Ewerlöf
1958–1959: Elin Lauritzen
1959–1961: Inger Leijonhufvud
1961–1967: Anna-Greta Hybbinette
1967–1970: Astrid Schönberg
1970–1976: Karin Ahrland
1976–1982: Birgitta Wistrand
1982–1985: Monica Påhlsson
1985–1989: Gerd Forssell
1989–1990: Ann Egefalk
1990–1991: Eivor Lilja
1991–1997: Inge Garstedt
1997–2000: Anna-Karin Sjöstrand
2000–2004: Irene Rundberg
2004–2008: Ann Falkinger
2008–2013: Birgitta Wistrand
2013–2018: Louise Lindfors
2018–2019: Ulrika Kärnborg (Christina Knight, acting)
2020–: Camilla Wagner

References

 Stig Hadenius, Torbjörn Nilsson & Gunnar Åselius : Sveriges historia. Vad varje svensk bör veta (History of Sweden. What every Swede should know)

External links

Liberal feminist organizations
1884 establishments in Sweden
Feminism and history
Feminist organizations in Sweden
Organizations based in Stockholm
Organizations established in 1884
Social history of Sweden
Voter rights and suffrage organizations
Women's suffrage in Sweden